Dream Away may refer to:

 "Dream Away" (George Harrison song), 1982
 "Dream Away" (Babyface and Lisa Stansfield song), 1994